Peter Murray Nicholson (March 31, 1919 – August 17, 1986) was a political figure in Nova Scotia, Canada. He represented Annapolis West in the Nova Scotia House of Assembly from 1956 to 1978 as a Liberal member.

A graduduate of Dalhousie University, Nicholson served in the Executive Council of Nova Scotia as Minister of Finance, and Deputy Premier.

In 1981, he was appointed a Justice of the Supreme Court of Nova Scotia.

Personal life
His son Peter John Nicholson is also a member of the Nova Scotia Liberal Party and represented the electoral district of Victoria in the Nova Scotia House of Assembly from 1978 to 1980.

References 

1919 births
1986 deaths
Nova Scotia Liberal Party MLAs
Members of the Executive Council of Nova Scotia
Deputy premiers of Nova Scotia
Dalhousie University alumni
Judges in Nova Scotia
People from Annapolis County, Nova Scotia
People from Cumberland County, Nova Scotia